Tharinda Ratwatte also known as Ashan Ratwatte (born 12 December 1995) is a Sri Lankan rugby union and sevens player who plays as a fly-half. His father Ashan Ratwatte was also a rugby union player having played for both Kandy SC and Ceylonese Rugby & Football Club. His granduncle Anuruddha Ratwatte was a politician.

Career 
He captained Trinity College rugby team in 2014 and soon after schooling he joined Ceylonese Rugby & Football Club. In 2014, he was appointed as the captain of the Sri Lankan Youth rugby team for the Junior World Rugby Tournament (JWRT) – Asian edition.

He was named in Sri Lankan men's rugby sevens squads for both the 2018 Commonwealth Games and 2018 Asian Games. Sri Lanka would eventually finish at fourth position in men's rugby sevens tournament during the 2018 Asian Games thereby narrowly missing out on a bronze medal after going down 36-14 to South Korea in bronze medal 3rd place match while Sri Lanka finished at fifteenth position in men's rugby sevens tournament at the 2018 Commonwealth Games.

He joined Kandy SC in 2019 after playing for Ceylonese Rugby and Football Club for four years. He was the top points scorer in the Dialog Rugby League 2019/20 with 123 points including 3 tries and 42 conversion points. 

He was included in 110 member Sri Lankan contingent for the 2022 Commonwealth Games. He scored a try against New Zealand during the opening game of the 2022 Commonwealth Games men's rugby tournament. It was the first try to be scored by Sri Lanka against New Zealand in rugby sevens at Commonwealth Games and Ashan also became only the second Sri Lankan after Sudath Sampath to score a try against New Zealand in any forms of rugby.

Arrest 
In June 2020, he was arrested and remanded for his involvement in an accident at Thummula junction which led to killing of a police officer attached to the State Intelligence Services.

References 

1995 births
Living people
Sri Lankan rugby union players
Sri Lankan rugby sevens players
Rugby union players at the 2018 Asian Games
Rugby sevens players at the 2018 Commonwealth Games
Rugby sevens players at the 2022 Commonwealth Games
Commonwealth Games competitors for Sri Lanka
Asian Games competitors for Sri Lanka
Alumni of Trinity College, Kandy